Bacalhau à Brás (meaning Cod à Brás) is a Portuguese dish made from shreds of salted cod (bacalhau), onions and thinly chopped (matchstick-sized) fried potatoes, all bound with scrambled eggs. It is usually garnished with black olives and sprinkled with fresh parsley. The origin of the recipe is uncertain, but it is said to have originated in Bairro Alto, an old quarter of Lisbon. The name "Brás" (or sometimes Braz, Blaise in English) is supposedly the name of its creator.

The "à Brás" technique is often used with other ingredients, such as vegetables, chicken, and mushrooms.

References

Cod dishes
Egg dishes
Fish dishes
Olive dishes
Portuguese cuisine